Onehunga Sports Football Club is a youth football club based in Onehunga, New Zealand. A senior side formerly competed in the Lotto Sport Italia NRFL Premier, last appearing in the competition in 2019.

The club is widely regarded within New Zealand for their strong focus on youth development.
In recent years, Onehunga Sports have most notably produced New Zealand internationals Sarpreet Singh, Chris Wood and Moses Dyer, and former head coach Hiroshi Miyazawa.

Club history
The club was founded in 1956 as Cornwall AFC, originally as a youth-oriented breakaway of Ellerslie AFC; Cornwall began play in the 1957 season, holding home games first at Auckland Domain until Fergusson Domain was made available in 1961. The club's change of name to Onehunga Sports and Soccer Club came in 1986, soon followed by the club's first promotion to the NRFL Premier in 1991.

As Onehunga gradually progressed, gaining promotion into higher divisions, tighter restrictions on the playing surface at Fergusson Domain were placed on the club. Relocation discussions began in 1995, and following the construction of clubrooms and training facilities the club moved to Waikakara Park for the 2004 season.

In 2010, Onehunga Sports won the NRFL Division 1 title, winning promotion to the regional top flight.

In 2017 and 2018, Onehunga Sports won consecutive NRFL Premier titles; 2017 also saw the team lift the Chatham Cup for the first time, defeating Central United in the final.

Notable former players

The following players went on to play professionally following their time at Onehunga Sports.

  Kohei Tezuka
  Takayuki Omi
  Lee Ho-jae
  Liam Jordan
  Sansern Limwattana
  Baramee Limwattana
  Moses Dyer
  Sarpreet Singh
  Chris Wood
  Max Mata
  Te Atawhai Hudson-Wihongi
  Katie Duncan
  Benjamin Mata
  Alex Paulsen
  Priscilla Duncan
  Mark Elrick
  Clayton Lewis (footballer)
  Pip Meo

Honours

Chatham Cup: 2017
 NRFL Men’s Premier winners 2018 
 Women’s Conference Division Champions 2018.
 NRFL Men’s Premier winners 2017
 Lotto NRFL and New Zealand Football 2017 Coach of the Year: Hiroshi Miyazawa.
 Lotto NRFL Men’s Premier Division Player of the Year 2017: Joseph Dawkins captain of the Men’s Premier team.
 Northern Regional Football community coach of the year 2022: Jannine Stewart

References

External links
New Zealand 2004/05 Season Results
Auckland Football federation Onehunga Sports page
Club website

Association football clubs in Auckland
1956 establishments in New Zealand